Édouard Mathé (1886–1934) was a French silent film actor.

He starred in some 51 films between 1914 and 1924.

Mathe appeared Barabbas in 1920. He regularly appeared in films directed by Louis Feuillade, such as the 1915 Les Vampires serial, the 1916 Judex serial, Tih Minh in 1918 and Parisette in 1921.

He died in Brussels in 1934.

Selected filmography
 The Two Girls (1921)
 The Two Boys (1924)

External links 

1886 births
1934 deaths
French male film actors
French male silent film actors
20th-century French male actors